Lázaro Cárdenas Batel (born 2 April 1964) is a Mexican politician. He served as governor of Michoacán from 2002 to 2008, representing the Party of the Democratic Revolution (PRD). Prior to his election to that office in 2001, he had represented his home state in both the federal Chamber of Deputies and the Senate.

Cárdenas Batel is a member of a distinguished political family: his grandfather, Lázaro Cárdenas del Río, served as President of Mexico from 1934 to 1940, and his father, Cuauhtémoc Cárdenas, has been a presidential candidate on three occasions and was the first democratically elected Head of Government of the Federal District (Mexico City). Both father and grandfather also served as governors of Michoacán.

Some PRD members criticized Cárdenas Batel for his lack of support for Andrés Manuel López Obrador during the 2006 presidential campaign; some even asked him to leave the party.  On the night of election, according to The Wall Street Journal, Batel accepted a call from López Obrador's opponent and eventual winner, Felipe Calderón. He was succeeded in the position as Michoacán governor by Leonel Godoy in February 2008.

Cárdenas Batel is a member of the Inter-American Dialogue.

Notes

External links
 Government of Michoacán: Lázaro Cárdenas Batel

1964 births
Living people
20th-century Mexican politicians
21st-century Mexican politicians
Governors of Michoacán
Members of the Senate of the Republic (Mexico)
Members of the Chamber of Deputies (Mexico)
Party of the Democratic Revolution politicians
People from Jiquilpan, Michoacán
Politicians from Michoacán